Tryon  is an unincorporated community in and the county seat of McPherson County, Nebraska, United States. The population was 107 at the 2020 census.

History
Tryon was originally called McPherson, and under the latter name was founded in 1890. It was renamed Tryon in 1892; the source of this name is disputed.

Geography
Tryon is located at  (41.555569, -100.966621).  According to the United States Census Bureau, the community has a total area of 1.2 square miles (3.0 km), all land.

Demographics

Tryon is part of the North Platte, Nebraska Micropolitan Statistical Area.  

For statistical purposes, the United States Census Bureau has defined Tryon as a census-designated place (CDP).

As of the census of 2000, there were 90 people, 48 households, and 27 families residing in the community. The population density was 78.2 people per square mile (30.2/km). There were 54 housing units at an average density of 46.9/sq mi (18.1/km). The racial makeup of the community was 100.00% White.

There were 48 households, out of which 20.8% had children under the age of 18 living with them, 45.8% were married couples living together, 10.4% had a female householder with no husband present, and 43.8% were non-families. 43.8% of all households were made up of individuals, and 37.5% had someone living alone who was 65 years of age or older. The average household size was 1.88 and the average family size was 2.46.

In the community, the population was spread out, with 15.6% under the age of 18, 5.6% from 18 to 24, 25.6% from 25 to 44, 10.0% from 45 to 64, and 38.9% who were 65 years of age or older. The median age was 59.4 years. For every 100 females, there were 87.5 males. For every 100 females age 18 and over, there were 72.7 males.

References

Census-designated places in Nebraska
Unincorporated communities in McPherson County, Nebraska
Unincorporated communities in Nebraska
County seats in Nebraska
North Platte Micropolitan Statistical Area